O.S.S. is a 1946 American war film starring Alan Ladd and Geraldine Fitzgerald about the Office of Strategic Services. It was directed by Irving Pichel, who would later be blacklisted by the House Un-American Activities Committee, and written by Richard Maibaum, a World War II veteran who would later write twelve of the first 15 James Bond films. Maibaum, a former Broadway actor, also narrates the film.

Plot
John Martin (Ladd) attempts to steal plans for an electric circuit from a plant in Baltimore, Maryland. Caught and arrested for espionage, he is turned over to the Office of Strategic Services, which is training a group of new recruits by sending them on test missions.

Along with three other men, Gates, Parker and Bernay, and one woman, Elaine Dupree (Fitzgerald), Martin (an assumed name like the others) is sent to France to blow up a railroad tunnel in order to paralyze Axis troops during the Allied invasion. Martin doubts Elaine can work under pressure because she is a woman, but she insists he treat her as any male agent.

During the group's first assignment, at a rural French inn, German agents kill Gates. A meeting of the French maquis is interrupted by German Colonel Paul Meister, who becomes immediately infatuated with Elaine. Elaine sculpts a bust of Meister's head, and when he announces his departure for Normandy on a troop train, she begs him to take her with him. With Martin's help, Elaine makes a duplicate bust and fills it with plastic explosives. She and Martin then blow up the tunnel. After Martin comes back for her under fire, Elaine makes him promise never to jeopardize a mission in order to rescue her.

On foot, they meet Bernay, who is their radio contact with the O.S.S. As the Allies break through at Normandy, Elaine and Martin make a deal with Amadeus Brink, an officer of the Gestapo, who hopes to secure his safety and a small fortune. Brink removes Martin and Elaine's "wanted" file from the Gestapo sector headquarters and arranges for his cousin, a courier, to hand over a diplomatic pouch to Bernay for photocopying. Bernay places the negative in the lining of Martin's hat. Against Brink's advice, Bernay radios a final message that the Nazis have broken one of the O.S.S. secret codes. Bernay is gunned down, and Martin and Elaine are questioned by the Gestapo, but are released before Meister catches Brink with their file papers.

Martin and Elaine are about to board a plane to safety when they are asked to complete one last mission. They must contact Parker, who is on assignment near the Rhine. At a farmhouse, Elaine is accosted by a group of drunken German soldiers. Parker, hiding among them, gives Elaine the Germans' troop dispositions. Martin leaves the farmhouse to radio in the positions. While he is gone, Meister arrests Elaine.

As the American troops advance through France, Brady tells Martin that Elaine's real name was Ellen Rogers, and he imagines that she might have been the girl next door in his hometown.

Cast
 Alan Ladd as Philip Masson / John Martin
 Geraldine Fitzgerald as Ellen Rogers / Elaine Dupree
 Patric Knowles as Cmdr Brady
 John Hoyt as Col. Paul Meister
 Gloria Saunders as WAC Operator Sparky
 Richard Webb as Parker
 Richard Benedict as Bernay
 Harold Vermilyea as Amadeus Brink
 Don Beddoe as Gates
 Onslow Stevens as Field
 Gavin Muir as Col. Crawson 
 Egon Brecher as Marcel Aubert
 Joseph Crehan as Gen. Donovan 
 Bobby Driscoll as Gerard
 Julia Dean as Madame Prideaux
 Crane Whitley as Arnheim

Production
Richard Maibaum had just served four years in the army. He returned to Paramount, where he had been a screenwriter, and became a producer. He was assigned the job of writing and producing O.S.S. "Every studio in Hollywood was racing to come out with the first OSS film," says Maibaum. "When I was in Washington I knew some of the OSS people so I had a head start on the subject."

The studio had hoped to cast Sterling Hayden who had served in the OSS in real life. However he was still in uniform in early 1946 so the film was assigned to Alan Ladd, whose casting was announced in January 1946. It was one of three movies being made about the OSS in Hollywood around this time, the others being 13 Rue Madeleine and Cloak and Dagger. This resulted in filming taking place in extreme secrecy.

Shooting ended in March and the film was rushed into release. O.S.S. was the first of the three films to reach cinemas.

"People had warned me about Alan and his wife Sue saying they were tough to work with but we got along marvellously," said Maibaum.

Reception
According to Maibaum the film "reaped substantial profits".

Maibaum and Ladd later collaborated on another OSS-related film, Captain Carey, U.S.A..

Radio adaptation
O.S.S. was presented on Lux Radio Theatre November 18, 1946. The adaptation starred Ladd and Veronica Lake.

References

Maibaum, Richard, Backstory: Interviews with Screenwriters of Hollywood's Golden Age, 1986

External links

Review of film at The New York Times
Review of film at Variety
Complete film at Internet Archive

1946 films
1940s spy films
1940s war films
American spy films
American war films
American black-and-white films
Films about Nazi Germany
World War II spy films
Films directed by Irving Pichel
Films with screenplays by Richard Maibaum
Films scored by Heinz Roemheld
Films scored by Daniele Amfitheatrof
Office of Strategic Services in fiction
Paramount Pictures films
1940s American films